Robert John Hayles (born 21 January 1973) is a former track and road racing cyclist, who rode for Great Britain and England on the track and several professional teams on the road. Hayles competed in the team pursuit and Madison events, until his retirement in 2011. He now occasionally provides studio-based analysis of cycle races for British Eurosport.

Career
He first represented Great Britain in the Olympic Games in Atlanta in 1996, where he rode the team pursuit. Hayles represented England in the points race and team pursuit at the 1998 Commonwealth Games. At the 2000 Summer Olympics, he won silver in the individual pursuit. He was a member of the pursuit team that came third, and rode the Madison with Bradley Wiggins, finishing fourth.

From 2001 to 2003 Hayles rode for the  team in France.

During this time Hayles rode the Paris–Roubaix classic, one of cycling's five 'monuments', three times but was unable to finish the race on any occasion. Hayles still reports to love the paved classic despite his own poor fortune.

In March 2008 he was withdrawn from the Great Britain team at the world track championships in Manchester, and was suspended for 14 days after a blood test showed a haematocrit 0.3% above the limit. His licence was restored after two weeks. The rules regarding haematocrit testing for track cycling were subsequently changed as the resting period before an event can cause the red cell volume to exceed 50%, with subsequent blood tests often proving the riders to be clean.

He won the 2008 national road championships but was not selected to represent Great Britain in the Beijing Olympics.

On 1 November 2008 he returned to the team pursuit for the Manchester round of the World Cup series.

Personal life
As a child, Hayles lived in Cowplain, Hampshire and attended Padnell Junior School. Hayles' father John Hayles, who died in 2016, was an amateur racing cyclist who became a professional wrestler in his twenties.
Hayles lives in Hayfield, Derbyshire, with his wife, former Olympic swimmer Vicky Horner, and their daughter, born 23 January 2006.

Major results

1993
 1st  Kilometre, National Track Championships
1994
 National Track Championships
1st  Kilometre
1st  Madison (with Bryan Steel)
1995
 1st  Madison (with Russell Williams), National Track Championships
1996
 1st  Points Race, National Track Championships
1997
 National Track Championships
1st  Points Race
1st  Individual Pursuit
1st  Madison (with Russell Williams)
 2nd Overall Premier Calendar
1998
 National Track Championships
1st  Points Race
1st  Individual Pursuit
1st  Madison (with Jon Clay)
1999
 National Track Championships
1st  Points Race
1st  Individual Pursuit
1st  Madison (with Bradley Wiggins)
2000
 1st  National Criterium Championships
 UCI Track World Championships
2nd  Team Pursuit (with Clay, Manning, Newton & Wiggins)
3rd  Individual Pursuit
 National Track Championships
1st  Points Race
1st  Individual Pursuit
 2nd Six Days of Grenoble (with Bradley Wiggins)
 3rd  Team pursuit (with Clay, Manning, Newton & Wiggins), Olympic Games
2003
 2nd  Team Pursuit (with Manning, Steel & Wiggins), UCI Track World Championships
 3rd  Individual Pursuit, National Track Championships
2004
 UCI Track World Championships
2nd  Individual Pursuit
2nd  Team Pursuit (with Manning, Newton & Steel)
 Olympic Games
2nd  Team pursuit (with Cummings, Manning & Wiggins)
3rd  Madison (with Bradley Wiggins)
2005
 UCI Track World Championships
1st  Madison (with Mark Cavendish)
1st  Team Pursuit (with Cummings, Newton & Manning)
2006
 Commonwealth Games
1st  Team Pursuit (with Cummings, Manning & Newton)
2nd  Individual Pursuit
 2nd  Team Pursuit (with Cummings, Manning & Thomas), UCI Track World Championships
2008
 1st  Road race, National Road Championships
 1st Beaumont Trophy
 1st Tour of Pendle
 1st Blackpool Grand Prix
 2nd National Criterium Championships
2009
 2nd National Criterium Championships
 2nd Colne Town Centre Grand Prix

References

Further reading

External links

1973 births
Living people
English male cyclists
Sportspeople from Portsmouth
Cyclists at the 1998 Commonwealth Games
Cyclists at the 2002 Commonwealth Games
Cyclists at the 2006 Commonwealth Games
Commonwealth Games gold medallists for England
Commonwealth Games silver medallists for England
Cyclists at the 1996 Summer Olympics
Cyclists at the 2000 Summer Olympics
Cyclists at the 2004 Summer Olympics
Olympic cyclists of Great Britain
Olympic silver medallists for Great Britain
Olympic bronze medallists for Great Britain
British cycling road race champions
Olympic medalists in cycling
UCI Track Cycling World Champions (men)
Medalists at the 2004 Summer Olympics
Medalists at the 2000 Summer Olympics
Commonwealth Games medallists in cycling
People from Hayfield, Derbyshire
Sportspeople from Derbyshire
English track cyclists
Medallists at the 1998 Commonwealth Games
Medallists at the 2006 Commonwealth Games